Mora is a Polish coat of arms. It was used by several szlachta families in the times of the Kingdom of Poland and Polish–Lithuanian Commonwealth.

History

Blazon

See also
 Polish heraldry
 Heraldic family
 List of Polish nobility coats of arms 
 Coat of Arms of Pope Benedict XVI
 Flag and coat of arms of Corsica

Bibliography 
 Franciszek Piekosiński: Heraldyka polska wieków średnich, Kraków, PAU, 1899

Polish coats of arms